Virgin Media O2 (legally incorporated as VMED O2 UK Limited) is a British mass media and telecommunications company based in London, England. The company was formed in June 2021 as a 50:50 joint venture between Liberty Global and Telefónica through the merger of their respective Virgin Media and O2 UK businesses.

It is one of the largest entertainment and telecommunications operators in the United Kingdom, with around 47 million customers in 2021.

As of December 2022, Virgin Media and O2 UK have separate consumer websites and branding, as well as operate two separate mobile services (Virgin Mobile and O2 Mobile). They have introduced their joint venture 'Volt', where consumers get rewarded for having both an O2 Pay Monthly plan with Virgin Media broadband. Notice to cancel a mobile virtual network operator deal previously formed between Virgin Mobile and Vodafone (made prior to the Virgin and O2 merger) was given in the company's Q2 2021 financial results, but has yet to take effect.

References

External links
 

2021 establishments in England
British companies established in 2021
Mass media companies established in 2021
Telecommunications companies established in 2021
British brands
British subsidiaries of foreign companies
Cable television companies of the United Kingdom
Companies based in London
Joint ventures
Liberty Global
Mobile phone companies of the United Kingdom
O2 (UK)
Telecommunications companies of the United Kingdom
Telefónica
Television networks in the United Kingdom
Virgin Media
Virgin Media O2